A referendum on building a bypass for Vaduz and Schaan was held in Liechtenstein on 19 September 1976. The proposal was rejected by 80.2% of voters.

Results

References

1976 referendums
1976 in Liechtenstein
Referendums in Liechtenstein
September 1976 events in Europe
History of Vaduz